Valentin Zhelev (born 18 September 1968) is a Bulgarian wrestler. He competed in the men's freestyle 74 kg at the 1992 Summer Olympics.

References

1968 births
Living people
Bulgarian male sport wrestlers
Olympic wrestlers of Bulgaria
Wrestlers at the 1992 Summer Olympics
People from Yambol